is a 2011 Japanese family-oriented comedy film directed by Takashi Miike. The film is live-action adaptation of the Japanese anime series Nintama Rantarō. The film stars Seishiro Kato as Rantaro who is sent to a ninja training school by his parents. During the summer, they are challenged by a group of rival ninjas which culminates in a race to ring a bell on top of a mountain.

Ninja Kids!!! had its world premiere at the New York Asian Film Festival on July 3, 2011 and was released theatrically in Japan on July 23 where it was the fourth-highest-grossing film in its opening week.

Plot
Set in the Muromachi period in early 16th-century Japan, the young ninja Rantaro (Seishiro Kato) is born into a family of low-ranking ninjas. Rantaro is sent by his father and mother (Shido Nakamura and Rei Dan) to attend the six-year course at a Ninja Academy run by Denzo Yamada (Susumu Terajima). Rantaro's homeroom teacher is Hansuke Doi (Takahiro Miura) and head of the Ninja Girl classes at the school is Shina Yamamoto who appears as either a beautiful young woman (Anne Watanabe) or an older woman (Tamao Nakamura). After going home to his parents' farm for the summer holidays, Rantaro is joined by his schoolmate Shinbei (Futa Kimura) but they later decided to stay with Kirimaru (Roi Hayashi) and teacher Doi. One day, some Usutake ninjas arrive at the house of flamboyant hairdresser Yukitaka Saito (Takeshi Kaga) and his son Takamaru (Takuya Mizoguchi) in order to kill both of them. Yukitaka and Takamaru used to belong to the Uuetake clan, but Rantaro and his friends aim to save them by joining a contest that ends with a race to ring a bell on top of a mountain.

Cast
Seishiro Kato as Rantaro
Roi Hayashi as Setsuno Kirimaru
Futa Kimura as Shinbei Fukutomi
Mikijirō Hira as Okawa
Susumu Terajima as Denzo Yamada, academy head
Takahiro Miura as Hansuke Doi
Koji Yamamoto as Tobe Shinzaemon
Furuta Arata as canteen lady
Anne Watanabe as Shina Yamamoto, as a beautiful young woman
Tamao Nakamura as Shina Yamamoto, as an old crone
Takuya Mizoguchi as Takamaru Saito
Akira Emoto as Usetake ninja Choro
Renji Ishibashi as Usetake ninja OB
Yusuke Yamamoto as Suzutakano Yoshiro
Yuma Ishigaki as Do Sukarasu

Release
Ninja Kids!!! had its world premiere at the New York Asian Film Festival on July 3, 2011. It premiered in Canada at the Fantasia Festival on July 16, 2011. After the premiere, negotiations were reported to be underway with a major production company for an American remake of the film.

It had its theatrical premiere in Japan on July 23, 2011. It was the fourth-highest-grossing film on its opening week in Japan grossing $1,060,634. It has grossed a total of $3,436,468.

Reception
Ninja Kids!!! has received generally positive reviews. Screen Daily gave a positive review, praising the film's energy while noting that "the film may enchant or completely turn off a viewer with its bizarre attempt to give the characters the exact same looks as their animated counterparts" Tradepaper Variety gave the film a favorable review stating that it had "joyous energy that propels its pint-size protagonists through a rapid-fire succession of slapstick gags, each more outrageous than the last." Film Business Asia gave the film a seven out of ten rating, noting that "in the second half, the film loses its initial playfulness and becomes more like rote silly comedy".

Andrew Chan of the Film Critics Circle of Australia writes, "'Ninja Kids!!!' is a massive disappointing effort from such a capable director. Sure some fun can be had and the class of kids are fun to watch, but it is only a manner of time before the same antics you once fall for, becomes quite frankly annoying and eventually regrettably bored."

Sequel
On July 6, 2013, a sequel was released, called .

Notes

External links

2010s children's comedy films
Japanese children's films
Films directed by Takashi Miike
Japanese martial arts films
Films based on television series
2011 films
2011 martial arts films
2011 comedy films
Films scored by Yoshihiro Ike
2010s Japanese films